Grays railway station is on the London, Tilbury and Southend line serving the town of Grays, Essex. It is  down the line from London Fenchurch Street via  and is located at the junction where a branch line from  via  re-joins the route from Rainham. Its three-letter station code is GRY.

It was opened in 1854. The station and all trains serving it are currently operated by c2c. Although outside the London fare zones, the station became part of the Oyster card pay-as-you-go network in 2010.

History
It was opened in 1854 on the London, Tilbury and Southend Railway. Until the early 1900s the station was known as Grays Thurrock.

In 2005 the station environment was refurbished, in particular the subway linking the platforms, and the surrounding highway infrastructure. In January 2006 the footbridge linking Grays High Street at either side of the railway was declared unsafe and closed due to structural problems with the supports and bracing, which had to be temporarily supported with scaffolding underneath the stair flights. A hoarding was subsequently erected on this scaffolding.  The footbridge reopened in May 2006.  Works to replace the stair flights have been completed. Although located at the end of the platforms, there is no station access at this point.

During 2008 and 2009 the four-carriage bay platform was extended to hold eight-coach trains. From 2011 to 2012 the through platforms were extended to receive 12-coach trains.

Services
The typical off-peak service frequency is:

 4 trains per hour (tph) westbound to London Fenchurch Street, of which:
 2 via ;
 2 via .

Connections

Local bus routes Z1, 22, 22A, 25, 33, 44, 66, 73, 73A, 83, 88, 100, 100X, 200, 200X, 201, 265, 268, 269, and 374 all serve the station.

References

External links

Transport in Thurrock
Railway stations in Essex
DfT Category C2 stations
Former London, Tilbury and Southend Railway stations
Railway stations in Great Britain opened in 1854
Railway stations served by c2c
Grays, Essex